Angeliki, literally "Angellike", is a Greek female given name. Notable people with the name include:

Angeliki Gremou (born 1975), Greek rower
Angeliki Kanellopoulou (born 1965), Greek tennis player
Angeliki Papoulia (born 1975), Greek actress

Greek feminine given names